Wied-Runkel was a small German sovereign state. Wied-Runkel was located around the town and castle of Runkel, located on the Lahn River. It extended from the town of Runkel to further north of Schupbach, but also held an exclave east of Villmar.

Wied-Runkel was a partition of Wied, and was raised from a County to a Principality in 1791. Wied-Runkel was mediatised to Nassau.

Counts of Wied-Runkel (1698–1791)
 1698–1699: Johann Friederich Wilhelm von Wied-Runkel († 1698)
 1692–1706: Maximilian Heinrich von Wied-Runkel († 1706), his grandson
 1706–1762: Johann Ludwig Adolph von Wied-Runkel († 1762), his son
 1762–1791: Christian Ludwig von Wied-Runkel († 1791), his son

Princes of Wied-Runkel (1791–1806)
 1791–1791: Christian Ludwig von Wied-Runkel († 1791)
 1791–1806: Karl Ludwig Friedrich Alexander († 1824), his son, until 1806, demoted to the rank of State Lord, with the titles of Prince of Wied and Lord of Runkel

References
Wirtz, L.: Die Grafen von Wied, Nassauische Annalen 48 (1927), 65; 
Gensicke, H.: Landesgeschichte des Westerwaldes, 1958.

1698 establishments in the Holy Roman Empire
1806 disestablishments in the Holy Roman Empire
States and territories established in 1698
Former monarchies of Europe